Marx Nekongo is a Namibian politician and member of SWAPO. He was the Councillor of Onayena Constituency from 1998 to 2015 and the Regional Councillor for Oshikoto Region in the National Council of Namibia from 2010 to 2015. Nekongo is Oshiwambo-speaking and has been born and raised in Ondonga.

In 2014, he was awarded The Excellent Order of the Eagle: Third Class by President Hifikepunye Pohamba of Namibia.

References

Living people
People from Oshikoto Region
SWAPO politicians
Ovambo people
Year of birth missing (living people)